was a Japanese actress, singer and radio entertainer. She was born on November 10, 1960, in the city of Moriyama, Aichi, (now Moriyama-ku, Nagoya, Aichi Prefecture), Japan and graduated from Aoyama Gakuin University. She made her singing debut in 1979; in 1982 she got an early break on the television show Owarai Manga Dōjō. Noteworthy radio and television appearances include Miss DJ Request Parade (radio, 1981), Expo Scramble (1985), Wakamono no Subete (1994), Meibugyō Tōyama no Kin-san (1995), Shitsurakuen (1997), Magarikado no Kanojo (2005) and Shichinin no Onna Bengoshi (2006). She is the subject of several photo books, including Woman (1993). Kawashima died on September 24, 2015, from bile duct cancer.  She was 54.

Filmography

Dramas
Keiji 110 kg 2 (TV Asahi / 2014) - Miyuki Akiba (ep.6-2)
 Egoist (Fuji TV / 2009)
 4 Shimai Tantei Dan (TV Asahi / 2008)
 Oniyome nikki: Ii yu da na (Fuji TV / 2007)
 Seven Female Lawyers | Shichinin no onna bengoshi (TV Asahi / 2006)
 New Woman of the Crime Lab 7 | Shin Kasouken no Onna (TV Asahi / 2006) - ep.5
  - Iwasaki Marie (Fuji TV / 2004)
 The Aaah Detective Agency | Aatantei Jimusho (TV Asahi / 2004)
 Beauty Seven (NTV / 2001)
 Kizudarake no Love Song (Fuji TV / 2001)
 The Chef (NTV / 1995)
 Wakamono no Subete (Fuji TV / 1994)

Movies
Mokka no koibito (2002)
Ghost Shout (2010)
Chai Koi (2013)

References

External links
TVdrama Database
 
Korea Portal news article

1960 births
2015 deaths
Japanese actresses
Japanese television personalities
Japanese female adult models
Japanese women pop singers
Japanese radio personalities
People from Nagoya
Aoyama Gakuin University alumni
Deaths from cholangiocarcinoma
Deaths from cancer in Japan